Collagen alpha-1(VI) chain is a protein that in humans is encoded by the COL6A1 gene.

Function 

The collagens are a superfamily of proteins that play a role in maintaining the integrity of various tissues. Collagens are extracellular matrix proteins and have a triple-helical domain as their common structural element. Collagen VI is a major structural component of microfibrils. The basic structural unit of collagen VI is a heterotrimer of the alpha1(VI), alpha2(VI), and alpha3(VI) chains. The alpha2(VI) and alpha3(VI) chains are encoded by the COL6A2 and COL6A3 genes, respectively. The protein encoded by this gene is the alpha 1 subunit of type VI collagen (alpha1(VI) chain). Mutations in the genes that code for the collagen VI subunits result in the autosomal dominant disorder, Bethlem myopathy.

References

Further reading

External links
  GeneReviews/NCBI/NIH/UW entry on Congenital Muscular Dystrophy Overview